Risca Community Comprehensive School is a community comprehensive school located in the town of Risca near Newport on the eastern side of the Caerphilly County Borough, South Wales. The school was opened by Queen Elizabeth II in 1977. There are approximately 900 pupils at the school aged from 11 to 16 (School years 7–11) when long time head mistress Kingston retired, John Kendall took over her role as Head master in September 2009.

External links 

Secondary schools in Caerphilly County Borough
Educational institutions established in 1977
1977 establishments in Wales